Frequent Express (FX) is a high-capacity bus route in Portland, Oregon, United States, operated by TriMet as FX2–Division. The  line runs east–west from 5th & Hoyt station on the Portland Transit Mall in downtown Portland to Cleveland Park and Ride in Gresham via Division Street. It connects Portland City Center, Portland State University (PSU), South Waterfront, Southeast Portland, and central Gresham, with transfers to MAX Light Rail and the Portland Streetcar at several stops along the route. FX features bus rapid transit (BRT) design elements such as dedicated lanes, transit signal priority, and  buses with all-door boarding—the second such service in the Portland metropolitan area after The Vine in Vancouver, Washington. Fares are collected through the Hop Fastpass payment system.

The Portland metropolitan area's regional government, Metro, adopted the Regional High Capacity Transit System Plan in 2009 and identified the Powell Boulevard corridor between downtown Portland and Gresham as a regional priority for transit investment. Planning commenced in 2013, and a bus service alternative along Division Street was selected. Construction of the Division Transit Project began in October 2019. FX2–Division opened on September 18, 2022; it replaced bus route 2–Division and became the inaugural route of FX.

History

Planning 

High-capacity transit (HCT) planning for the Portland metropolitan area had been last evaluated in the 1982 Light Rail System Plan; it was updated by the Portland metropolitan area's regional government, Metro, with its adoption of the Regional High Capacity Transit System Plan on July 9, 2009. The updated plan identified the region's transportation corridors viable for HCT implementation and deemed the Powell Boulevard corridor between downtown Portland and the eastern suburb of Gresham a "near-term regional priority". Four years later, Metro and Portland's regional transit agency, TriMet, began studying alignment and mode alternatives along the corridor and several blocks farther north along Division Street, with BRT, light rail, and streetcar under consideration. At the time, Powell and Division were served by bus routes 9–Powell Blvd and 4–Division/Fessenden, respectively, which together carried more than 17,000 riders between Portland and Gresham daily.

In 2014, a steering committee for the Powell–Division Transit and Development Project was formed, whose members voted that September to abandon the further study of rail alternatives in favor of a bus-only option, citing fewer property and roadway impacts and shorter construction time. The project began conceptual design work two months later. The following year, plans to construct dedicated lanes along the project route were scrapped despite being a key feature of BRT; planners defended the decision by claiming that reducing lanes for dedicated bus lanes "would very likely result in traffic diversion to other streets and significant delay". Instead, it was decided that the system would use transit signal priority to move buses quickly. The steering committee initially wanted a route that would use Powell Boulevard on its westernmost section, head north to Division Street somewhere between 52nd and 92nd avenues, and continue east until reaching Mt. Hood Community College (MHCC) in Gresham. In March 2016, a study conducted by TriMet revealed that this preferred route would take approximately 11 minutes longer to travel than the existing bus service. It was also estimated to exceed $200 million; to ensure federal funding was acquired, a target cost was set at $175 million.

The steering committee formally recommended a locally preferred alternative (LPA) on November 7, 2016. They reached a consensus to drop the Powell segment for a Division Street-only alignment and to serve the Portland Transit Mall instead of Columbia and Jefferson streets in downtown Portland. They remained undecided for whether the route would use the Hawthorne Bridge or Tilikum Crossing to cross the Willamette River, but ensuing decisions by TriMet planners would resolve to utilize Tilikum Crossing. The LPA had also scaled back the route's eastern end to terminate at Gresham Central Transit Center, rather than at MHCC, to lower cost, but subsequent LPA refinements re-extended the route slightly farther east to the Cleveland Avenue MAX station.

Metro transferred the project to TriMet in December 2016, and TriMet renamed it the "Division Transit Project". The design contract for stations, traffic signals, and civil infrastructure improvements was awarded to WSP USA the following year. In September 2018, scheduled service changes split 4–Division/Fessenden into two lines; a new 2–Division line took over the Division Transit Project route on the east side. The following month, TriMet unveiled a mock-up station in Gresham with a borrowed articulated bus from C-Tran, the transit agency serving Clark County, Washington, to simulate boarding. In March 2019, TriMet issued a request for proposals (RFP) for the procurement of  articulated buses and received responses from BYD Auto, New Flyer, and Nova Bus. During an initial evaluation process, TriMet noted that the battery electric buses proposed by BYD and New Flyer did not meet the RFP's specifications and eliminated the bus type from further consideration. That August, TriMet selected Nova as the manufacturer and, in the following month, placed an initial order for 31 diesel buses with an option to purchase as many as 159 diesel and hybrid electric bus alternatives.

Funding and construction 

The cost of the Division Transit Project was estimated at $175 million, half of which was anticipated to be funded by the Federal Transit Administration (FTA) under the Small Starts program. In August 2018, the Portland City Council authorized $17.7 million to cover its share of local funding, sourced through developer fees, and Gresham allocated $500,000 the following month. The project received tentative approval from the FTA for $87.4 million in April 2019, and was formally awarded the grant on January 23, 2020. Federal Highway Administration funds contributed another $27.9 million, while $40.7 million from TriMet, $240,000 from Metro, $150,000 from the Oregon Department of Transportation, and $130,000 from Multnomah County covered the remaining local share.

TriMet appointed Portland-based Raimore Construction, a certified disadvantaged business enterprise (DBE), as the Division Transit Project's general contractor. It was the largest contract ever awarded in Oregon to a DBE—a business majority-owned by women or minorities. DBEs ultimately completed at least 84 percent of the overall project. Early construction work began in October 2019. Work was split into three zones on the east side and progressed concurrently from east to west. Construction of the first station platforms had begun by June 2020. By October, 19 platforms had been poured, and seven bioswales and five pedestrian safety islands had been built. Crews completed around 40percent of the project within the first year despite working through the COVID-19 pandemic. In April 2021, TriMet opened the first two upgraded stations at 130th Avenue eastbound and 135th Avenue westbound for use by buses on the existing 2–Division route. That June, TriMet unveiled the articulated bus that would serve the project and announced that the service would be called "Frequent Express", or "FX". Operator training of the new buses started in April 2022.

Opening and impact 

In June 2022, TriMet announced service level reductions for 10 bus routes, including the FX2–Division route, due to a lack of operators. The operator shortage, the largest in the agency's history, was attributed to competition from other transit and delivery services and safety concerns amid an increase in assaults on drivers. In its application for FTA funding, TriMet had promised service frequencies as often as six minutes. As a result of the driver shortage, service was "temporarily" reduced to every 12 minutes, A grand opening celebration took place on September 17, 2022. Festivals were held at OMSI/Southeast Water station, Portland Community College Southeast campus, and Gresham Central Transit Center, and FX rides between the festival sites were free. The Portland Streetcar also offered free rides that day to encourage people to transfer to FX and attend the festivities. FX2–Division began revenue service the following day, on September 18.

Several weeks after opening, the Willamette Week published an article that compared travel times with the former 2–Division route. TriMet had estimated the service would be 15 to 20 percent faster than the original 2–Division route, which took 66 minutes to travel from Gresham to downtown Portland; the article claimed that FX took 67 minutes at peak commute hours for the same trip.

Future plans

Design 

FX features BRT design elements such as dedicated bus lanes, transit signal priority, and  buses with all-door boarding—the second such service in the Portland metropolitan area after The Vine in Vancouver, Washington.

Route and stations 

FX2–Division begins at the northern end of the Portland Transit Mall on Irving Street and 5th Avenue near Union Station in downtown Portland, with 5th and Hoyt station as its western terminus. Within the transit mall, buses travel in a one-way pair: Portland-bound on 6th Avenue and Gresham-bound on 5th Avenue, except on a segment between Lincoln and Hall streets where Portland-bound buses run along 4th Avenue. From Lincoln Street, the route follows the shared Portland–Milwaukie light rail alignment eastward through Harbor Viaduct and Tilikum Crossing. It diverges from this shared alignment on 7th Avenue and circles a block before entering Division Street on 8th Avenue. The route stays along Division Street through Southeast Portland and Gresham until Roberts Avenue, where it turns for 8th Street and terminates at the Cleveland Avenue station park and ride. Portland-bound buses in central Gresham turn from 8th Street back to Division Street via Kelley Avenue.

FX2–Division serves 42 stations within the cities of Portland and Gresham, primarily along Division Street. Stops east of Division Street and 11th Avenue were built as part of the Division Transit Project; four station types were designed to accommodate right-of-way restrictions, with stations along the outer parts of the route (east of 82nd Avenue) built larger with more amenities. Platforms are long enough to accommodate simultaneous boarding of the three-door buses, and larger stations are wider to incorporate bicycle lanes.

Dedicated lanes and transit signal priority 

Segments of the FX2–Division route use transit-only lanes, particularly west of 11th Avenue. Along the Portland Transit Mall in downtown Portland, FX buses will travel in lanes dedicated to transit buses and light rail vehicles, separated from private vehicle traffic. FX2–Division travels the remainder of its route through Division Street in mixed traffic, but it uses transit signal priority to move quickly. TriMet contracted LYT, a firm based in Santa Clara, California that develops solutions for public transit, to implement transit signal priority for the Division Transit Project. LYT's cloud-based solution, called "LYT.transit", was installed inside FX buses and at 58 signalized intersections along Division Street. The technology allows each bus to send its speed and location to a cloud server, which then relays the information to the traffic signals; it uses artificial intelligence to track all buses in real-time and adapt the phasing of traffic lights to keep buses moving.

Fleet 

FX operates a fleet of 30  articulated buses; they were manufactured by Nova Bus in Plattsburgh, New York. Each bus can carry up to 115 passengers, 60% more than TriMet's standard  bus, and features all-door, right-side boarding via three doors. Up to two bicycles can be stored inside the bus using roll-in racks located near the rear.

On November 2, 2022, TriMet announced that it would replace the articulated Nova Bus fleet with standard  buses following the discovery of mechanical issues. A driver comment about noises while steering prompted an inspection of buses that found loose or missing fasteners. A recall was issued by Nova Bus on November 15 that affected the FX fleet, with repairs and testing expected to last until December.

Service 
FX2–Division operates daily with service from 4:04 am to 2:35 am the following day on weekdays, and 4:26 am to 1:39 am on Saturdays and Sundays. Buses run with a headway of 12 minutes during most of the day; they run more frequently during weekday rush hours and less frequently during the early mornings and late evenings.

Fares are collected using the Hop Fastpass payment system, with card readers located on board, next to each of the bus's three doors. Riders paying with cash must board at the front door, where there is a farebox and a ticket printer.

Note

References

External links 

 
 
 

2019 establishments in Oregon
Transportation in Portland, Oregon
TriMet